Henry Bernard Stricker (1888 – 15 February 1917) was a South African first-class cricketer and South African Army soldier.

Stricker was born at Beaconsfield in 1888 to Louis Stricker senior and his wife, Maude. He was educated at Sacred Heart College, Johannesburg. Stricker was selected to play for Transvaal in March 1913, making his first-class debut against Griqualand West, scoring an unbeaten 66. He made two further first-class appearances in January 1914 for Transvaal against the touring Marylebone Cricket Club. In his three first-class matches, he scored 70 runs at an average of 23.33. With the ball he took two wickets, with best figures of 1 for 23. Stricker served in the South African Army during the First World War, where he was a conductor in the South African Service Corps (Animal Transport). He died from Blackwater fever in February 1917 at Dodoma in German East Africa, aged 29. His brother was the Test cricketer Louis Stricker.

References

External links

1888 births
1917 deaths
Cricketers from Kimberley, Northern Cape
South African cricketers
Gauteng cricketers
South African military personnel of World War I
South African military personnel killed in World War I
Infectious disease deaths in Tanzania